Breitenbach-Haut-Rhin (Alsatian: Bräitebàch or Bräiteba) is a commune in the Haut-Rhin department in Grand Est in north-eastern France.

Its inhabitants are Breitenbachois. Its official name distinguishes it from Breitenbach, Bas-Rhin.

The place name appears in thirteenth-century documents, and is composed of the words breit ("wide") and bach ("stream"). The valley in which it lies was a possession of the Abbey of Munster until the French Revolution.

See also
 Communes of the Haut-Rhin department

References

Communes of Haut-Rhin